Galactic Empires is a science fiction anthology edited by American writer Gardner Dozois, published in 2008. It should not be confused with the two Brian Aldiss anthologies Galactic Empires Volumes One and Two published in 1976.

Contents

The book includes 6 novellas, all commissioned for this book and published here for the first time. This is the second anthology of original SF novellas edited by Dozois for the Science Fiction Book Club, the first being One Million A.D., published in 2005. Two of the six authors also appear in both anthologies: Robert Reed and Alastair Reynolds. The stories are as follows.

Peter F. Hamilton: "The Demon Trap"
Neal Asher: "Owner Space"
Robert Reed: "The Man With the Golden Balloon"
Alastair Reynolds: "The Six Directions of Space"
Stephen Baxter: "The Seer and the Silverman"
Ian McDonald: "The Tear"

Links

References

External links

2008 anthologies
Gardner Dozois anthologies
Science Fiction Book Club original anthologies